U.S.D. Palmese is an Italian association football club, based in Palma Campania, Campania. Currently it plays in Eccellenza Campania/B.

History
The club was founded in 1914.

Scudetto Dilettanti 2000–01
Palmese in the season 2000–01, from Serie D was promoted to Serie C2, conquering also the Scudetto Dilettanti.

Honours
Serie D:
 Winners 1: 2000–01
Scudetto Dilettanti:
 Winners 1: 2000–01

Stadium
The club's home stadium is the Stadio Comunale di Palma Campania, which seats 5,500 spectators.

External links
Official site

Football clubs in Italy
Football clubs in Campania
Association football clubs established in 1914
1914 establishments in Italy